Motti Aroesti (born 11 July 1954), is a retired Israeli professional basketball player and coach.

Biography
Motti Aroesti was born in Givatayim.

Basketball career
Aroesti played club basketball with Maccabi Tel Aviv, from 1973 to 1988.

Aroesti wore the Maccabi jersey for 15 consecutive seasons, and won an Israeli League title for each of those years, as well as 11 Israeli State Cups. Aroesti helped Maccabi win its first FIBA Europe Champions Cup (EuroLeague) title in the 1976–77 season, and he was still the team's starting point guard, when his team lifted its second top continental trophy in the 1980–81 season.

National team 
As a member of the senior Israeli national basketball team, Aroesti played at the following major tournaments: the 1976 European Olympic Qualifying Tournament, 1979 EuroBasket, the 1980 European Olympic Qualifying Tournament, the 1983 EuroBasket, the 1984 European Olympic Qualifying Tournament, and the 1985 EuroBasket. He won the silver medal at the 1979 EuroBasket, while playing with the senior Israeli national team.

Coaching
After he retired from playing professional basketball, Aroesti became a basketball coach. He also worked as a sports director.

See also
Sports in Israel

References

External links
FIBA Profile
FIBA Europe Profile
Israeli Super League Profile
Maccabi Tel Aviv Profile
Motti Aroesti Greatest Euroleague Contributors nominees list

1954 births
Living people
Asian Games gold medalists for Israel
Asian Games medalists in basketball
Basketball players at the 1974 Asian Games
Israeli basketball coaches
Israeli men's basketball players
Israeli people of Greek-Jewish descent
Maccabi Rishon LeZion basketball players
Maccabi Tel Aviv B.C. players
Medalists at the 1974 Asian Games
Sportspeople from Tel Aviv
Point guards
Competitors at the 1977 Maccabiah Games
Jewish men's basketball players
Maccabiah Games basketball players of Israel
Maccabiah Games silver medalists for Israel